Hoary basil may refer to a number of plant species:
 Pitotecnanthemum incanum (aka Hoary mountainmint)
 Ocimumy × africanum
 Ocimum americanum or Ocimum canum
 Ocimum kilimandscharicum

References